Hank Lazer (b. San Jose, California) is an American poet and critic who teaches at the University of Alabama.

Biography
Lazer received an A.B. in English from Stanford University, and M.A. and Ph.D. degrees the University of Virginia. He has been a professor of English at the University of Alabama since 1977. From 1991 to 1997, he was Assistant Dean for Humanities and Fine Arts; from 1997 to 2006 he was Assistant Vice President for Undergraduate Programs and Services; and since 2006 he serves as Associate Provost for Academic Affairs.

He is also the director of Creative Campus, a university-wide program designed to "expand arts experiences for the community." A noted poet in his own right, he is responsible for bringing renowned writers to the Tuscaloosa campus, including Robert Creeley and Neil Gaiman.

Literary work
Lazer has published fourteen books of poetry since 1992. In addition, he published two volumes of criticism, Opposing Poetries: Volume One—Issues and Institutions and Opposing Poetries: Volume Two—Readings with Northwestern University Press (2006), and edited a collection of essays by various writers and critics (including Helen Vendler), What is a Poet?, for the University of Alabama Press (1987). Religious studies scholar William G. Doty called his "apocalyptic" work "prophetic and creative."

References

External links
Hank Lazer at SUNY Buffalo's Electronic Poetry Center
Biography on University of Alabama, English site
Hank Lazer author page at Lavender Ink.

American male poets
Living people
University of Alabama faculty
Year of birth missing (living people)